Stephen "Steve" Calder (born December 1, 1957) is a Canadian sailor. Born in Detroit, Michigan, he won a bronze medal in the Soling Class at the 1984 Summer Olympics with Hans Fogh and John Kerr.

References 
 

1957 births
Living people
American sportsmen
Artemis Racing sailors
Canadian male sailors (sport)
Clearwater High School alumni
European Champions Soling
Medalists at the 1984 Summer Olympics
North American Champions Soling
Olympic bronze medalists for Canada
Olympic medalists in sailing
Olympic sailors of Canada
Sailors at the 1984 Summer Olympics – Soling
Sportspeople from Detroit